Aela Janvier (born 4 November 1999) is a Canadian swimmer. She competed in the women's 200 metre backstroke event at the 2018 FINA World Swimming Championships (25 m), in Hangzhou, China.

References

External links
 

1999 births
Living people
Canadian female backstroke swimmers
Place of birth missing (living people)
20th-century Canadian women
21st-century Canadian women